The Japan women's national cricket team is the team that represents the country of Japan in international women's cricket matches.

In April 2018, the International Cricket Council (ICC) decided to grant full Women's Twenty20 International (WT20I) status to all its members. Therefore, all Twenty20 matches played between Japan women and other ICC members since 1 July 2018 have been a full WT20I.

History
They made their international debut at the 2003 IWCC Trophy in the Netherlands. These were the first ODI matches played by any Japanese team, with the Japanese men's team yet to play at that level. They did not meet with much success though, losing all five matches and giving away an incredible 104 extras in their match against The Netherlands.  They were bowled out for just 28 against Pakistan in that competition, with 20 of those runs coming in extras and just 8 from the bat, with the openers top scoring with 3 runs apiece. They are yet to play any WODI after this tournament. 

Their return to international level did not come until September 2006 when they faced Papua New Guinea in a three match series of one day games to decide which country would represent the East Asia/Pacific region in the World Cup Qualifier in Ireland some time in 2007. Japan showed some improvement from the IWCC Trophy, but still lost all three games. However, these matches were also not considered as WODI.

In December 2020, the ICC announced the qualification pathway for the 2023 ICC Women's T20 World Cup. Japan were named in the 2021 ICC Women's T20 World Cup EAP Qualifier regional group, alongside seven other teams.

In January 2023 it was announced that Japan and Indonesia would be included in Asian Cricket Council (ACC) pathway events, while remaining in the ICC East Asia-Pacific development region.

Tournament history

Women's Cricket World Cup Qualifier
2003: 6th (DNQ)
2011: 9th (DNQ)

Asian Games
2010: Bronze
2014: Quarter-finals

Women East Asia Cup
2015: 3rd place
2017: 2nd place
2019: 3rd place

Honours

Others
Asian Games
 Bronze Medal (1): 2010

Records
International Match Summary – Japan women

Last updated 30 October 2022

Women's One-Day International
Highest team total: 85 v Scotland on 25 July 2003 at Sportpark Klein Zwitserland, The Hague.
Highest individual innings: 18, Ema Kuribayashi v Scotland on 25 July 2003 at Sportpark Klein Zwitserland, The Hague. 
Best innings bowling: 2/6, Yuko Sasaki v Scotland on 25 July 2003 at Sportpark Klein Zwitserland, The Hague.

ODI record versus other nations

Records complete to WODI #450. Last updated 26 July 2003.

Women's Twenty20 International
Highest team total: 139/4 v Hong Kong on 29 October 2022 at Kaizuka Cricket Ground, Kaizuka.
Highest individual innings: 63, Akari Kitayama v Samoa on 7 May 2019 at Independence Park, Port Vila.
Best innings bowling: 3/6, Nao Tokizawa v South Korea on 22 September 2019 at Yeonhui Cricket Ground, Incheon.

Most T20I runs for Japan Women.

Most T20I wickets for Japan Women.

T20I record versus other nations
Records complete to WT20I #1285. Last updated 30 October 2022.

Current squad
Miho Kanno
Erika Ida
Shizuka Kubota
Ayako Nakayama
Yuka Yoshida
Yuko Saito
Kurumi Ota
Atsuko Suda
Ayako Iwasaki
Shizuka Miyaji
Mariko Yamamoto
Ema Kuribayashi
Erina Kaneko
Fuyuki Kawai
Yuko Kuniki
Miho Asami

See also
 List of Japan women ODI cricketers
 List of Japan women Twenty20 International cricketers
 Cricket in Japan

References

External links
 Japan Cricket Association Official website
 Cricinfo Japan

Cricket in Japan
Women's national cricket teams
Women
Women's national sports teams of Japan